Findchóem (also spelled Finnchóem, Findcháem, Finncháem, Fionnchaomh) is a character from the Ulster Cycle of Irish mythology. The sister of the Ulster king Conchobar mac Nessa, she is the wife of the poet Amergin, the mother of Conall Cernach and the wet-nurse of Cúchulainn.

Ulster Cycle